Josephus Calasanz Fließer (born 1896 in Perg) was an Austrian clergyman and bishop for the Roman Catholic Diocese of Linz. He was ordained in 1919. He was appointed bishop in 1946. He died in 1960.

References 

1896 births
1960 deaths
Austrian Roman Catholic bishops
People from Perg District